Lovre Vulin (born 2 September 1984) is a Croatian footballer who plays as a defender who is currently playing for NK Pakoštane.

Career
Vulin started his career with Croatia's Hajduk Split before moving to Standard Liège in 2006. He had a short spell at Austrian Bundesliga side Kapfenberger in 2012.

References

External links
 
 
 fotbal.idnes.cz Profile 

1984 births
Living people
People from Pakoštane
Association football defenders
Croatian footballers
Croatia youth international footballers
Croatia under-21 international footballers
HNK Hajduk Split players
NK Novalja players
NK Mosor players
Standard Liège players
Zalaegerszegi TE players
FC Slovan Liberec players
SK Dynamo České Budějovice players
Kapfenberger SV players
Croatian Football League players
Belgian Pro League players
Czech First League players
Austrian Football Bundesliga players
Croatian expatriate footballers
Expatriate footballers in Belgium
Croatian expatriate sportspeople in Belgium
Expatriate footballers in Germany
Croatian expatriate sportspeople in Germany
Expatriate footballers in Hungary
Croatian expatriate sportspeople in Hungary
Expatriate footballers in the Czech Republic
Croatian expatriate sportspeople in the Czech Republic
Expatriate footballers in Austria
Croatian expatriate sportspeople in Austria